The 1988 Giro del Trentino was the 12th edition of the Tour of the Alps cycle race and was held on 4 May to 6 May 1988. The race started in Torbole and finished in Riva del Garda. The race was won by Urs Zimmermann.

General classification

References

1988
1988 in road cycling
1988 in Italian sport
May 1988 sports events in Europe